Boxing at the 2010 Asian Games was held in Lingnan Mingzhu Gymnasium, Foshan, China from November 16 to 26, 2010.

Schedule

Medalists

Men

Women

Medal table

Participating nations
A total of 210 athletes from 35 nations competed in boxing at the 2010 Asian Games:

References

 AIBA Results

External links
Boxing Site of 2010 Asian Games

 
2010
2010 Asian Games events
Asian Games
2010 Asian Games